Bashar al-Shatti (born 22 September 1982) is a Kuwaiti singer, songwriter and actor, and plays piano and guitar. He began his career as an orchestra chorale member. He served as a judge in the singing competition Arab Idol.

Star Academy
Bashar's fame started along with the reality television show called Star Academy on LBC. There were rumors of a love affair between him and Moroccan contestant Sophia Marikh. Gulf News reported that teenagers welcomed him as a superstar.
Bashar was the runner-up, but lost to Mohammed Attiyeh of Egypt.

The following October, according to an Al Bawaba report, police investigated al-Shatti following a scuffle in Marina Mall in Kuwait. The report stated that fans gathered for pictures and autographs at a coffee shop where he and his brother were sitting, and that al-Shatti got into a physical altercation with some young hecklers, who later called the police.

Later career
After Star Academy, he signed a multi-record deal with Rotana Records. Al-Shatti recorded two records with Rotana. In 2008, he terminated his contract with Rotana to cooperate with Arab Radio and Television Network (ART) and release a third album. Al-Shatti has collaborated with Kuwaiti artist Nabil Shoail. Al-Shatti composes for television serials and cartoons, and has written religious music. He participated in the composition of the Alwatan TV inauguration operetta. Al-Shatti recently branched out into an acting career, taking a role on an MBC television series. Additionally, he was the artist panellist on Qualitynet's home video contest, "Fakkar Ana Khouf?" which was decided on 15 December 2012.

Impact
In Arab Television Today, British media author Naomi Sakr described Al Shatti as "charismatic". Marwan M. Kraidy has called him "a pan-Arab heartthrob".

Personal life
Bashar has three brothers and one sister. He married in early 2011. He has a son, Abdul Rahman. He has also spoken his views on the Syrian revolution, saying, "Aside from being an artist, I am first a human. It isn't human to accept murder, massacres and crimes against children."

Discography
Bashar Al-Shatti (Rotana, 2005)
Thany Marra (Rotana, 2006)
Akwa Men El Awal (ART, 2009)

References 

Kuwaiti male singers
Kuwaiti people of Iranian descent
Living people
1982 births
Rotana Records artists
Contestants from Arabic singing competitions